Kevin Labanc (born December 12, 1995) is an American professional ice hockey right wing for the San Jose Sharks of the National Hockey League (NHL). He was drafted by the Sharks in the sixth round, 171st overall, in the 2014 NHL Entry Draft.

Playing career
Labanc got his first taste of hockey at the Staten Island Skating Pavilion. As a youth, he played in the 2008 Quebec International Pee-Wee Hockey Tournament with the New Jersey Devils minor ice hockey team. He later played amateur junior hockey in New Jersey through the Youth Hockey League, to the Atlantic Junior Hockey League with the New Jersey Rockets before he was selected to play in the U.S. National Development Team Program through the United States Hockey League.

At the conclusion of his tenure in the U.S. Development Program, Labanc opted to forgo collegiate hockey and pursue a major junior career in the Ontario Hockey League with the Barrie Colts. He was originally drafted by the Colts in the 2011 Priority Selection in the sixth round, 103rd overall. He scored 35 points in 65 games as a rookie in the 2013–14 season with the Colts and was drafted by the San Jose Sharks in the 2014 NHL Entry Draft, 171st overall.

In the following two season with the Colts, Labanc broke out offensively with back-to-back 100-point seasons. In the 2015–16 season, his overage year, Labanc led the Colts and the League with 88 assists and 127 points. He was awarded the Leo Lalonde Memorial Trophy and the Jim Mahon Memorial Trophy as the top scoring right winger in the OHL. He completed his junior career with the Colts amongst franchise leader's in points-per-game games and finished fourth overall in scoring with 269 points in just 198 games.

On March 9, 2016, Labanc was signed by the San Jose Sharks to a three-year entry-level contract. He was assigned to join AHL affiliate, the San Jose Barracuda, for their post-season run, making his professional debut in a solitary game.

After attending the Sharks' training camp in preparation for his first full professional season in 2016–17, Labanc was assigned to begin the year with the Barracuda. After scoring 10 points in just 6 games in the AHL, Labanc received his first recall to the San Jose Sharks on November 7, 2016. He made his debut, featuring on a scoring line, alongside Logan Couture and Joonas Donskoi, in a 3–0 victory over the Washington Capitals on November 8. In his fifth game, Labanc scored his first NHL goal, assisted by Joe Thornton, against Jake Allen, in a 3–2 defeat to the St. Louis Blues on November 17, 2016.

On February 9, 2019, Labanc scored his first NHL hat-trick in a 5–2 victory against the Edmonton Oilers. He finished the 2018–19 season with 17 goals and 56 points in 82 games. In Game 7 of the Sharks' first-round series against the Vegas Golden Knights, Labanc contributed on all four Sharks' third period goals (one goal and three assists). The team eventually won the game in overtime, advancing to the second round. The feat made Labanc the first player in NHL postseason history to record four points in a single period of a Game 7. For the 2019 postseason, the Sharks were eliminated in six games by the eventual champions, the St. Louis Blues, during the Western Conference Finals. Overall, Labanc recorded four goals and five assists in 20 games.

On July 8, 2019, the Sharks re-signed Labanc to a one-year, $1 million contract extension.

On October 10, 2020, the Sharks re-signed Labanc to a four-year, $18.9 million contract extension.

Personal life
Kevin Labanc is the son of Milan Labanc, a former Slovak professional ice hockey player and his wife Anika. They emigrated from Slovakia to the United States in 1994 and settled in Brooklyn. He speaks Slovak.

Career statistics

Regular season and playoffs

International

Awards and honours

References

External links

1995 births
Living people
American men's ice hockey right wingers
American people of Slovak descent
Barrie Colts players
Ice hockey players from New York (state)
San Jose Barracuda players
San Jose Sharks draft picks
San Jose Sharks players
Sportspeople from Staten Island
USA Hockey National Team Development Program players